Wang Tie (born October 1957) is a former Chinese politician who served as the Vice Director of Henan People's Congress. He was dismissed from his position in August 2018 and placed under investigation by the Central Commission for Discipline Inspection and the National Supervisory Commission.

Career
Wang was born in October 1957, and he was graduated from Zhengzhou University, China University of Political Science and Law and Huazhong University of Science and Technology. He served as the teacher of Henan Business School, the officer of the Business Department of Henan, the deputy director of Henan Salt Administration, the manager of Henan Deputy Food Company, the deputy director of the Trade Department of Henan, the Mayor of Jiyuan, and the Secretary of the CPC Jiyuan Committee.

In 2003, Wang was appointed as the mayor of Xinyang, and promoted to the post of the party secretary in 2006. He was appointed as the Vice Governor of Henan, then he was appointed as the Vice Director of Henan People's Congress in 2018.

Downfall
On August 17, 2018, Wang Tie was placed under investigation by the Central Commission for Discipline Inspection, the party's internal disciplinary body, and the National Supervisory Commission, the highest anti-corruption agency of the People's Republic of China, for "serious violations of regulations and laws". According to the report, he turned himself in, gave back his illicit gains and showed sincere remorse. On November 19, 2018, Wang was expelled from the Communist Party and demoted to a "deputy department director level" position. The Central Commission for Discipline Inspection said in a statement that Wang was found to have severely violated political discipline and political rules, conducted vote buying and canvassing in elections, refused to report personal matters to authorities, took advantage of his posts to assist relatives in business and illegally accepted gifts and money, and violated the life discipline.

References

1957 births
Chinese Communist Party politicians from Henan
People's Republic of China politicians from Henan
Political office-holders in Henan
Living people
Politicians from Zhumadian
Zhengzhou University alumni
China University of Political Science and Law alumni
Huazhong University of Science and Technology alumni